This Charming Girl (lit. "Woman, Jeong-hae" or "Girl, Jeong-hae") is a South Korean drama film written and directed by Lee Yoon-ki.

Plot
Jeong-hae's life is as monotonous as her job at the post office. Her apartment, which is not far from where she works, is filled with things she has bought through the home shopping network; only a stray cat waits to greet her each day. On Sunday afternoons, she sits on her veranda with her cat listening to children play below; she loves this time the most. In her life, this is probably the most peaceful time. Jeong-hae's childhood memories include her mother with a pencil in one hand and a cigarette in the other, quietly drawing and writing. It is a memory still hard for her to handle, for her mother's sudden death left a deep scar. When it feels like only memories are taking over her life, she cannot hold back her tears. However, one day a love that moves her heart appears: "Tonight, would you have dinner with me at my place?" Slowly, something starts growing once again in her heart. She is at last hopeful that she could be happy.

Cast
Kim Ji-soo as Jeong-hae
Hwang Jung-min as Writer
Kim Hye-ok as Mother
Lee Dae-yeon as Uncle
Lee Geum-ju as Aunt
Kim Mi-seong as Colleague 1
Lee Mi-mi as Colleague 2
Kim Jung-ki as Manager
Seo Dong-won as Sad man
Park Sung-woong as Ex-husband
Kim Kkot-bi as young Jeong-hae

Awards and nominations
2004 Pusan International Film Festival
 Winner - New Currents Award

2005 Berlin International Film Festival
 Winner - NETPAC Award

2005 Deauville Asian Film Festival
 Winner - Lotus Jury Prize

2005 Sundance Film Festival
 Nomination - Grand Jury Prize

2005 Singapore International Film Festival
 Winner - Best Director (Lee Yoon-ki)
 Winner - Best Actress (Kim Ji-soo)

2005 Baeksang Arts Awards
 Nomination - Best New Actress (Kim Ji-soo)

2005 Grand Bell Awards
 Nomination - Best New Director (Lee Yoon-ki)
 Nomination - Best New Actress (Kim Ji-soo)

2005 Blue Dragon Film Awards
 Winner - Best New Actress (Kim Ji-soo)
 Nomination - Best New Director (Lee Yoon-ki)

2005 Korean Film Awards
 Winner - Best New Actress (Kim Ji-soo)

2005 Busan Film Critics Awards
 Winner - Best New Actress (Kim Ji-soo)

See also
List of Korean-language films

References

External links
 

2004 films
2004 romantic drama films
Films directed by Lee Yoon-ki
2000s Korean-language films
South Korean romantic drama films
2000s South Korean films
CJ Entertainment films
Showbox films